The 1879 Southern Maori by-election was a by-election held on 7 July 1879 in the  electorate during the 6th New Zealand Parliament.

The by-election was caused by the resignation of the incumbent MP Hōri Kerei Taiaroa when he was appointed to the Legislative Council.

The by-election was won by Ihaia Tainui.

Results
The following table gives the election results:

References

Southern Maori 1879
1879 elections in New Zealand
Māori politics